The Ministry of Agriculture, Forestry and Fisheries is the government ministry of Cambodia that is responsible for governing activities of agriculture, forestry and the fishery industry in Cambodia.

Institutions
Public schools, companies and rubber plantations related to the Ministry include:
Royal University of Agriculture (RUA)
Cambodia Agricultural Research and Development Institute (CARDI)
Prek Leap National College of Agriculture (PNCA) 
Kampong Cham National School of Agriculture
Agricultural Input Company
Cambodia Rubber Development Company
Cambodia Rubber Research Institute
Rubber Import, Export, Transport and Equipment Company
Rubber Plantation Companies: Chup Rubber Plantation Co., Krek Rubber Plantation Co., Memut Rubber Plantation Co., Snoul Rubber Plantation Co., Chamkar Andong Rubber Plantation Co., Beungket Rubber Plantation Co. and Peam Cheing Rubber Plantation Co.

Crimes and disturbing issues
In the years of 2007-8 the Cambodian Government, was responsible for the sale of 45% of the total landmass in Cambodia to primarily foreign investors. The land concessions are to be used for agro-industrial, forestry, tourism and constructional projects, even though larger parts of the land are wildlife protections or national parks even (See Cardamom Mountains for example). The vast majority of the Economic Land Concessions (ELCs) have in fact been issued in violation of Cambodia's 2001 Land Law and its Subdecree on ELCs and are therefore illegal. 

The landsales has been perceived by observers, to be the result of extensive land grabbing and corruption within the judicial system, ministries and government bureaucracy of Cambodia. It has stirred serious unrest across the country, within recent years.

Ministers

See also
 Agriculture in Cambodia
 Deforestation in Cambodia

References

External links
Ministry of Agriculture, Forestry and Fisheries
Ministry of Agriculture, Forestry and Fisheries - Ministry directory
Forestry Administration, home page

Forestry in Cambodia
Cambodia
Cambodia
Cambodia
Government ministries of Cambodia
Business organisations based in Cambodia
Scientific organisations based in Cambodia